The Museum of the Moscow Railway at Rizhsky station in Moscow (Russian: Музеи Московской железной дороги: Экспозиционная площадка натурной железнодорожной техники музея истории Московской железной дороги) is an open-air exhibition of rolling stock near the Moscow Rizhsky railway station in Moscow.

Collection 
The following repainted rail vehicles are exhibited:

See also 
 Museum of the Moscow Railway (Paveletskaya station)

External links 
 Offizielle Website

References 

Railway museums in Russia
Museums in Moscow